The following is an alphabetical list of professional Canadian painters, primarily working in fine art painting and drawing. See other articles for information on Canadian art or a List of Canadian artists for other information.

A

Isabella Mary Abbott (1890–1955) artist
Lily Osman Adams (1865–1945)painter
Melita Aitken (1866–1945)artist
Aleen Aked (1907–2003)Canadian-American painter
Amelia Alcock-White (born 1981)
Wilhelmina Alexander (1871–1961)oil painter
David T. Alexander (born 1947)landscape painter
Libby Altwerger (1915–1995) painter and printmaker
Helen Andersen (1919–1995)painter
Marie-Elmina Anger (1844–1901)painter
Caroline Armington (1875–1939) painter and printmaker
Shelagh Armstrong (born 1961) illustrator
William Armstrong (1822–1914) landscape watercolourist
Silvia Araya (born 1930)Chilean-born Canadian painter
Caven Atkins (1907–2000) painter
William Edwin Atkinson (1862–1926)landscape painter
Joe Average (born 1957)
Leo Ayotte (1909–1976) oil painter
Philip Aziz (1923–2009) painter, sculptor

B

Unity Bainbridge (1916–2017) – artist and poet
Earl W. Bascom (1906–1995) American painter, printmaker and sculptor; raised in Canada
J. M. Barnsley (1861–1929)painter
Anne Meredith Barry (1932–2003) - painter
Robert Bateman (born 1930) naturalist and painter
Maxwell Bates (1906–1980) painter, architect
Valentina Battler (born 1946) – artist
Aba Bayefsky (1923–2001) painter
Anong Beam – Ojibwe artist and curator
John William Beatty (1869–1941) – painter
François Beaucourt (1740–1794) painter
Claire Beaulieu (born 1955) – painter
Noah Becker (born 1970) – painter
Christi Belcourt (born 1966) – Métis painter
Frederic Marlett Bell-Smith (1846–1923) – watercolour and oil landscape painter
Arnold Belkin (1930–1992) Mexican painter; known as "the Canadian Son of Mexican muralism"
William Berczy (1744–1813) pioneer and painter
Rachel Berman (1946–2014) – American-born Canadian painter
Judith Berry (born 1961) – painter
George Théodore Berthon (1806–1892) portrait painter
David Bierk (1944–2002) American-born Canadian painter
André Charles Biéler (1896–1989) painter and teacher
Olive Biller (1879–1957) – artist and illustrator
B.C. Binning (1909–1976) painter, architect and teacher
Ron Bloore (1925–2009) painter, member of the Regina Five
Bruno Bobak (1923–2012) Polish-born Canadian painter
Sylvie Bouchard (born 1959) - painter

Molly Lamb Bobak (1920–2014) painter
Blanche Bolduc (1906/1907–1998)folk artist
Eleanor Bond (born 1948) – painter, printmaker, and sculptor
Louis Boekhout (1919–2012) – Dutch Canadian landscape painter
Blanche Bolduc (1906/1907–1999) – Quebec painter
David Bolduc (1945–2010) – abstract painter
Paul-Émile Borduas (1905–1960)painter; known for his abstract paintings
Simone Mary Bouchard (1912–1945) – painter and textile artist
Eva Theresa Bradshaw (1871–1938)painter
Fritz Brandtner (1896–1969) modernist painter
Claude Breeze (born 1938)modern figurative painter
Henrietta Hancock Britton (1873–1963) – painter
Bertram Brooker (1888–1955)  writer, painter, musician, and one of the first Canadian abstract artists
Annora Brown (1899–1987) painter and graphic artist
Franklin Brownell (1856–1946) Impressionist painter, teacher
William Blair Bruce (1859–1906) Impressionist painter
Kittie Bruneau (1929–2021)painter and printmaker
William Brymner (1855–1925) figure and landscape painter
Dennis Burton (1933–2013) modernist painter
Ralph Wallace Burton (1905–1983)
Jack Bush (1909–1977) abstract expressionist
Sheila Butler (born 1940) painter

C

 Sveva Caetani (1917–1994) – Italian-Canadian painter
 Oscar Cahén (1916–1956)painter, illustrator, member of Painters Eleven
 Florence Carlyle (1864–1923) – figure and portrait painter
 Franklin Carmichael (1890–1945) painter; member of the Group of Seven
 Emily Carr (1871–1945) artist and writer; inspired by the indigenous peoples of the Pacific Northwest Coast
 A. J. Casson (1898–1992) painter of landscapes, forests and farms; member of the Group of Seven 
 Frederick Sproston Challener (1869–1959) painter, muralist and teacher
 Jack Chambers (1931–1978) painter and filmmaker
 Benjamin Chee Chee (1944–1977) Ojibwa painter
 Nan Lawson Cheney (1897–1985) – painter and medical illustrator
 Victor Child (1897–1960) newspaper illustrator, painter and etcher
 Paraskeva Clark (1898–1986) painter
 Alberta Cleland (1876–1960) landscape painter
 Pierre Clerk (born 1928) – painter, sculptor and printmaker
 Nora Collyer (1898–1979) – modernist painter; member of the Beaver Hall Group
 Alex Colville (1920–2013) painter
 Charles Comfort (1900-1994) painter, muralist, designer, educator
 Emily Coonan (1885–1971) – post-impressionist painter; member of the Beaver Hall Group
 Sonia Cornwall  (1919–2006) – painter
 Bruno Cote (1940–2010) landscape painter
 Graham Coughtry (1931–1999) painter
 Holly Coulis (born 1968)  painter
 Linda Craddock (born 1952)painter and photographer
 Sarah Lindley Crease (1826–1922) – watercolour painter
 Rody Kenny Courtice (1891–1973) – painter
 William Cruikshank (painter) (1848–1922) painter, teacher
 Maurice Cullen (1866–1934) Impressionist painter
 Greg Curnoe (1937–1992) painter, co-founder of CAR
 Gertrude Spurr Cutts (1858–1941) – landscape painter

D

 Caroline Louisa Daly (1832–1893) – watercolour painter
 Kathleen Daly (1898–1994) painter
 Ken Danby (1940–2007) painter
 Charles Daudelin (1920–2001) sculptor and painter
 Julia Dault (born 1977) painter
 Forshaw Day (1837–1903) painter and educator
 Louis de Niverville (1933–2019) painter
 Simone Dénéchaud (1905–1974) painter
 Mary Dignam (1860–1938) painter; pioneer activist for women artists
 Audrey Capel Doray (born 1931)multimedia artist
 Marie-Denise Douyon (born 1961)painter and illustrator
Joseph Drapell (born 1940) abstract painter
 Moira Dryer (1957–1992) – abstract painter
 Ann Macintosh Duff (1925–2022)
Edmond Dyonnet (1859–1954)painter

E
 Wyatt Eaton (1849–1896) portrait painter
 Allan Edson (1846–1888)landscape painter
 Harold Elliott (1890–1968)  painter
 Catherine Everett (born 1957)sculptor and painter
 Peter Maxwell Ewart (1918–2001)landscape painter

F

Holly Farrell (born 1961)  painter
Claire Fauteux (1889–1998)  painter
Henriette Fauteux-Massé (1924–2005) painter
Marcelle Ferron (1924–2001) - painter
George Fertig (1915–1983) painter and photographer
 Lionel LeMoine FitzGerald (1890–1956)artist; member of the Group of Seven
 Lita Fontaine (born 1953) Indigenous multi-media painter
Dulcie Foo Fat (born 1946) painter
Nehemiah Ford (birth year unknown; died between 1858 and 1862)politician and painter
Michael Forster (artist) (1907–2002) painter
Marc-Aurèle Fortin (1888–1970) painter
Daniel Fowler (1810–1894) watercolour painter
John Arthur Fraser (1838–1898) painter

G
 Clarence Gagnon (1881–1942) painter from Quebec, etcher
 Yves Gaucher (1934–2000) painter, printmaker
 Robert Genn (1936–2014) painter
 Sky Glabush (born 1970) painter 
 Eric Goldberg (1890–1969) Jewish-Canadian landscape painter
 Regina Seiden Goldberg (18971–1991) - painter
 Charles Goldhamer (1903–1985) watercolour painter
 Betty Goodwin (19231–2008) - painter
 Richard Gorman (1935–2010) painter and printmaker
 Vaughan Grayson (1894–1995) painter and printmaker from Saskatchewan
 Daniel Charles Grose (1832–1900)  painter

H
 Alexandra Haeseker (born 1945) – painter, printmaker, installation artist 
 John Hall (born 1943) – painter
 Joice M. Hall (born 1943) – painter
 Kazuo Hamasaki (1925–2005)painter; Canadian Japanese watercolour painter noted for combining 16th-century Japanese techniques with Canadian styles
 Mary Riter Hamilton (1873–1954)painter; female World War I artist, dubbed "Canada's first woman artist"
 John A. Hammond (1843–1939) painter, photographer and printmaker 
 Sylvia Hahn (1911–2001)  artist
 Clara Isabella Harris (1887–1974)  impressionist painter
 Lawren Harris (1855–1970) painter; member of the Group of Seven 
 Robert Harris (1848–1919) painter; noted for his portrait of the Fathers of Confederation
 Ted Harrison (1926–2015) painter 
 Monique Harvey (1950–2001)  painter
 Guenter Heim (1935–2014)  impressionistic landscapes
Pierre Henry (born 1932)  painter; creator of the anecdotism art movement
 Carle Hessay (1911–1978)  painter
 Prudence Heward (1896–1947) painter; member of the Beaver Hall Group 
 Edwin Holgate (1892–1977) artist, painter and engraver; member of the Group of Seven
 William Hope (1863–1931) – painter, war artist, landscapes
 Yvonne McKague Housser (1898–1996)  painter, teacher
 Patrick Howlett (born 1971) – visual artist
 E.J. Hughes (1913–2007) – painter
 Natalka Husar (born 1951) – painter

I 
 Jay Isaac (born 1975) – painter
 Gershon Iskowitz (1921–1988)  painter

J
 A. Y. Jackson (1882–1974) painter; founding member of the Group of Seven
 Otto Reinhold Jacobi (1812–1901) painter 
 Richard Jacobson (born 1959) artist and illustrator
 Charles William Jefferys (1869–1951) painter, illustrator, author and teacher; known as a historical illustrator
 Frank Johnston (1888–1949) artist; member of the Group of Seven 
 Sarah Anne Johnson (born 1976) - painter 
 John Young Johnstone (1887–1930) Impressionist painter
 Leonel Jules (born 1953) painter

K
 Paul Kane (1810–1871) Irish-Canadian painter of First Nations peoples in the Canadian West and the Native Americans in the Oregon Country
 Andrew Kiss (born 1946) – oil painting, landscapes
 Adrian Kleinbergen (born 1961) – drawing and painter
 Bert Kloezeman (1921–1987) painter and art educator
 Harold Klunder (born 1943) Dutch-born Canadian painter
 Dorothy Knowles (born 1927) painter
 F. McGillivray Knowles (1860–1932) painter
 Wanda Koop (born 1951) - painter
 Cornelius Krieghoff (1815–1872) painter of landscapes and outdoor life
 Maya Kulenovic (born 1975) painter
 William Kurelek (1927–1977)  artist and writer

L
 Stephen Lack (born 1946) actor, painter
 Ozias Leduc (1864–1955) Quebec painter of portraits, still lifes, landscapes and religious works
 Gary Lee-Nova (born 1943) painter and multimedia artist
 Joseph Légaré (1795–1855) painter
 Irène Legendre (1904–1992) painter
 Jean Paul Lemieux (1904–1990) painter
 Serge Lemoyne (1941–1998) performance artist and painter
 Rick Leong (born 1973) – painting and drawing
 Rita Letendre (1928–2021) painter, muralist  
 Maud Lewis (1903–1970)  painter
 Robert Henry Lindsay (1868–1938) painter
 Oleg Lipchenko (born 1957) painter, graphic artist and illustrator
 Arthur Lismer (1881–1969) painter; member of the Group of Seven 
 Judith Lodge (born 1941) painter, photographer
 Joy Zemel Long (1922–2018) - painter
 Laura Muntz Lyall (1860–1930) impressionist painter
 John Goodwin Lyman (1886–1967)

M
 J. E. H. MacDonald (1873–1932) painter; member of the Group of Seven
 Jock Macdonald (1887–1960) painter; member of the Painters Eleven 
 Landon Mackenzie (born 1954) painter
 Clifford Maracle (1944–1996) – painter and sculptor
 Agnes Martin (1912–2004) - painter
 Arthur N. Martin (1889–1961) painter
Henrietta Mabel May (1877–1971) - painter; member of the Beaver Hall Group
 Doris McCarthy (1910–2010) artist specializing in abstracted landscapes
 Jean McEwen (1923–1999) abstract painter
 Florence Helena McGillivray (1864–1938) landscape painter
 Elizabeth McIntosh (born 1967)  abstract painter
 Arthur McKay (1926–2000) abstract painter
 Landon Mackenzie (born 1954) - painter
 Isabel McLaughlin (1903–2002) painter
 Pegi Nicol MacLeod (1904–1949) painter
 Thomas Mower Martin (1838–1934) landscape painter
 Marmaduke Matthews (1837–1913) painter
 Ray Mead (1921–1998) abstract expressionist; member of Painters Eleven 
 John Meredith (1933–2000)abstract expressionist
 Muriel Millard (1922–2014) painter
 Kenneth G. Mills (1923–2004) painter
 David Milne (1882–1953) painter, printmaker and writer
 Lisa Milroy (born 1959) painter, especially of everyday items
 Berge Missakian (1933–2017) painter
 Janet Mitchell (1912–1998) painter
 Guido Molinari (1933–2004) abstract painter
 Caroline Monet (born 1985) - painter
Kent Monkman (born 1965) First Nations painter
 Ron Moppett (born 1945) painter
 James Wilson Morrice (1865–1924) landscape painter
 Kathleen Moir Morris (1893–1986) painter; member of the Beaver Hall Group 
 Norval Morrisseau (1932–2007)  painter
 Louis Muhlstock (1904–2001) – Jewish-Canadian painter
 Kathleen Munn (1887–1974) painter
 Laura Muntz, see Laura Muntz Lyall (1860-1930)

N
 Tomori Nagamoto (born 1973) – visual artist
 Kazuo Nakamura (1926–2002) painter and member of Painters Eleven
 Lilias Torrance Newton (1896–1980) painter and member of the Beaver Hall Group
 Jack Nichols (1921–2009) painter
 Guity Novin (born 1944) Iranian-Canadian figurative painter

O
 Lucius Richard O'Brien (1832–1899) painter
 Daphne Odjig (1919–2016) - Indigenous painter, activist
 Will Ogilvie (1901–1989) painter, war artist
 Bobbie Oliver (born 1943) painter
 Kim Ondaatje (born 1928) painter, photographer and documentary filmmaker
 Toni Onley (1928–2004) landscape painter
 Henry Orenstein (1918–2008) artist specializing in easel paintings, murals and set design

P
 Alfred C. Patstone (1908–1999) romantic realist oil painter, rural
 Paul Peel (1860–1892) painter
 Eric Pehap (1912–1981)  abstract artist
 Alfred Pellan (1906–1988)  modern art pioneer, founder of Montreal art group known as Prisme d'yeux, rivals to Les Automatizes
 Sophie Pemberton (1869–1959) painter
 George Douglas Pepper (1903–1962) painter
 William Perehudoff (1918–2013)  painter
 Christiane Pflug (1936–1972) German-born Canadian painter and draughtsperson
 Bev Pike - painter
 Antoine Plamondon (1804–1895) painter
 Joseph Plaskett (1918–2014) painter of interiors, still lifes and portraits
 Annie Pootoogook (1969–2016) - painter
 Alicia Popoff (1950–2015)  abstract painter, acrylic and mixed media
 Christopher Pratt (born 1935) painter and flag designer
 Mary Pratt (1935–2018) painter specializing in still life paintings
 Jon Pylypchuk (born 1972) painter and sculptor

R
 Gordon Rayner (1935–2010) abstract expressionist
 George Agnew Reid (1860–1947) painter
 Mary Hiester Reid (1854–1921) painter
 Mary Wrinch Reid (1877–1969) painter 
 Jean-Paul Riopelle (1923–2002) painter and sculptor from Quebec
 Jim Robb (born 1933) - painter from the Yukon
 Goodridge Roberts (1904–1974) painter of landscapes, unassuming still lifes and interiors
 Albert H. Robinson (1881–1956) painter
 Otto Rogers (1935–2019) painter
 Danièle Rochon (born 1946) painter from Quebec
 Trisha Romance (born 1951) painter in Ontario
 William Ronald (1926–1998) abstract painter and founder of Painters Eleven
 Cheryl Ruddock – painter

S
 Anne Savage (1896–1971) painter, art teacher; member of the Beaver Hall Group 
 Carl Schaefer (artist) (1903–1995) painter, art teacher
 Charlotte Schreiber (1834–1922) English-Canadian painter and illustrator
 Jacques Schyrgens (born 1923) Belgian-Canadian painter of watercolors and illustrator
 Marian Dale Scott (1906–1993) painter
 Regina Seiden (1897–1991) painter
 Ernest Thompson Seton (1860–1946) painter. naturalist, illustrator
 Jack Shadbolt (1909–1998) painter, war artist and teacher
 Arnold Shives (born 1943) painter, multimedia artist and printmaker
 Henrietta Shore (1880–1963) painter
 Edward Scrope Shrapnel (1845–1920) painter
 Ron Shuebrook (born 1943) – artist
 Claude A. Simard (1943–2014) painter of garden scenes, landscapes, still lifes and the human figure
 Paul Sloggett (born 1950) painter and teacher
 Edith Smith (1867–1954) painter and teacher
 Freda Pemberton Smith (1902–1991) painter
 Gordon A. Smith (1919–2020) painter, printmaker, sculptor and teacher
 K. C. Smith (1924–2000) painter, conservationist
 Michael Snow (born 1929) painter
 Daniel Solomon (born 1945) abstract painter and teacher
 David G. Sorensen (1937–2011) painter
 Paul Soulikias (1926–2023) painter
 Owen Staples (1866–1949)  painter, etcher, political cartoonist
 Godfrey Stephens (born 1939) painter, sculptor
 John Edmund Strandberg (1911–1996) Swedish Canadian landscape painter
 Philip Surrey (1910–1990) painter
 Marc-Aurèle de Foy Suzor-Coté (1869–1937) painter and sculptor

T
 Takao Tanabe (born 1926) landscape painter
 Daniel Taylor (born 1955) painter of realistic portraits and wildlife art
 David Thauberger (born 1948) painter
 Tom Thomson (1877–1917) painter; mentor to the Group of Seven
 Mildred Valley Thornton (1890–1967) portrait painter of First Nations elders, landscape painter
 Gideon Tomaschoff (born 1956) abstract artist
 Denyse Thomasos (1964 - 2012) - painter
 Gentile Tondino (1923–2001) artist and educator; taught with Arthur Lismer
 Jacques de Tonnancour (1917–2005) artist and educator
 Fernand Toupin (1930–2009) Quebec abstractionist and member of the Plasticiens movement
 Harold Town (1924–1990) artist and member of Painters Eleven
 Cory Trépanier (born 1968) landscape painter and filmmaker

U
 Tony Urquhart (1934–2022) painter and sculptor

V
 Armand Vaillancourt (born 1929) sculptor and painter 
 François Vaillancourt (born 1967) painter and art director
 Florence Vale (1909–2003) painter influenced by Surrealism, Cubism, Expressionism
 Frederick Varley (1881–1969) painter, war artist; member of the Group of Seven
 James Verbicky (born 1973) mixed media, abstract artist
 Frederick Arthur Verner (1836–1928) painter of First Nations and buffalo
 Roy Henry Vickers (born 1946) First Nations painter

W
 Horatio Walker (1858–1938) oils and watercolor painter
 Ronan Walsh (born 1958) – artist
 Emily Warren (1869–1956) oils and watercolors painter
 Lowrie Warrener (1900–1983)  abstract painter
 Darrell Wasyk (born 1958) painter
 Homer Watson (1855–1936) landscape painter
 Vera Weatherbie (1909–1977) - painter
 Barbara Weaver-Bosson (boen 1953) - painter
 Diane Whitehouse (born 1940) - painter
 Joyce Wieland (1930–1998)  filmmaker and painter
 Chloe Wise (born 1990) - painter
 York Wilson (1907–1984)painter and muralist
 Matthew Wong (1984–2019)painter

Y
 Walter Yarwood (1917–1996) abstract painter and member of Painters Eleven
 M. A. Yewdale (1908–2000) – pioneer and heritage artist
 Jinny Yu (born 1976)

Z 
 Marguerite Porter Zwicker (1904–1993) – watercolors painter and art promoter

See also 

 Beaver Hall Group
 Canadian Art Club
 Group of Seven
 Indian Group of Seven
 List of Canadian artists
 Painters Eleven
 Regina Five

References

Bibliography 
     
 Burnett, David and Schiff, Marilyn. Contemporary Canadian Art Edmonton, Hurtig Publishers, 1983. .
 Duval, Paul. Four Decades: The Canadian Group of Painters and their contemporaries – 1930–1970 Toronto, Vancouver, Clarke, Irwin & Company Limited, 1972. 
 Duval, Paul. High Realism in Canada Toronto, Vancouver, Clarke, Irwin & Company Limited, 1974. .
 Fenton, Terry and Wilkin, Karen. Modern Painting In Canada: Major Movements in Twentieth Century Canadian Art Edmonton, Hurtig Publishers, 1978. .
 Harper, Russell. Painting in Canada: A History 2nd ed. Toronto: University of Toronto Press, 1981. 
 Lord, Barry. The History of Painting in Canada: Toward A People's Art Toronto, New Canada Publications, 1974. .
 Morris, Jerrold. 100 Years of Canadian Drawings Toronto, Methuen, 1980. .
 
 
 Reid, Dennis A Concise History of Canadian Painting 2nd Edition. Toronto: Oxford University Press, 1988. .
 

 
Painters
Canada
 Painters